Silesia (Sleazy, Slesia) was a thin twilled woven cloth made of  linen or cotton. The term denoted a wide range of fabric grades from greige goods to dyed and finished cloth. Silesia was used for various linens, for lining clothes, and in window blinds. Cotton Silesia was calendered to obtain a gloss finish.

History 
The fabric was originally manufactured in Silesia, a province of Prussia.

References 

Woven fabrics